Trust AM is the operating name of the radio station initially serving the Doncaster Royal Infirmary on Armthorpe Road in Doncaster, and the Bassetlaw District General Hospital on Blyth Road in Worksop and as of 8 December 2019 Montagu Hospital in Mexborough.

Started from an idea in the summer of 1972, supported by the Worksop Lions, Radio Kilton had its 1st Broadcast on Saturday 2 December. In the beginning, equipment was limited and programmes consisting of music and requests only went out at the weekend. By Autumn of 1976 the station had its first purpose built facility, known today as Studio 2. In the following years membership and programming expanded and soon after the radio had its first outside broadcast. Continued expansion was seen in the 1980s and 1990s. In 2000, broadcasting went on free-to-air on 1278 MW, broadcasting 24/7. After a little more organization came another name change to what we know now as Trust AM. In December 2019 the station launched its Listen on-line service. Whilst Trust AM retains the name that listeners have come to know, the AM broadcasts on 1278 ceased at the end of 2019.

Over at Doncaster, Radio Danum started in November 1980 and within a year was broadcasting over 74 hours a week with over 48 presenters. The station had a varied output even back then. In its first year it was attending events like the Finningley Air Show. The station even had their own amateur dramatic productions. Over the years Radio Danum became more successful and even had a special anniversary broadcast in the week the station became 10 years old! However, since the mid to late 1990s the station suffered from a lack of volunteers and funding. Since then the station has been incorporated with Trust AM to become part of the larger organization. An updated Doncaster studio was (re)opened in September 2005.

Staffed by volunteers and operating 24 hours a day, the station aims to provide "More Variety" to its listeners with a blend of music based mainly on the 1950s to the present day, but with even older songs added to the mix. Listeners can get a request played on any live show, Trust AM also broadcasts specialist shows for Love songs, Country, Soul, Musicals and much more.

The charity is controlled by an executive committee who meet at least 4 times per year. The management team meet in between those times to discuss the day-to-day running of the station. Unlike most radio stations, Trust AM do not have a single station manager. Instead, a team of up to 9 members share the responsibilities and make joint decisions. This has proved to be a very successful formula.

Bassetlaw Hospital has two studios, while Doncaster Royal Infirmary has an office/studio. All are equipped to a high specification with many modes available to the on-air presenter. From gramophone records, through cassette tape, to CD and even computerised playout systems. A jingle player system, using a touchscreen monitor, was installed in May 2009. The music library holds in excess of 170,000 tracks.

Listeners can hear the broadcasts via headsets connected to an internet capable device using the hospital Wi-Fi network. The station is available on-line at www.trustam.com, on Alexa Audio devices in the UK using the "trust am" Alexa Skill and on Google devices using the Google Action "Talk to trust am"

The Oldest DJ in Town, Len Bratley, was 85 years old in 2011 and presented two Nostalgia themed shows per week, covering the earlier part of the 20th century. Bratley had been featured in several newspapers and even appeared on TV for his role with the station. He died on 25 August 2011.

Hospitals served
Doncaster Royal Infirmary, Doncaster
Bassetlaw District General Hospital, Bassetlaw
Montagu Hospital, Mexborough

External links
Trust AM, The station's own website.
Listen On-Line
Programme Archive

Hospital radio stations
Mass media in Doncaster
Radio stations in Yorkshire
Radio stations established in 1972